Angel is a Broadway musical that opened at the Minskoff Theatre in New York on May 4, 1978. It was based on Ketti Frings’ Pulitzer Prize winning 1957 theatrical adaptation of Thomas Wolfe's best-selling 1929 novel, Look Homeward, Angel.

The musical featured songs with lyrics by Peter Udell and music by Gary Geld—the same team who created the musicals Shenandoah and Purlie. Frings and Udell collaborated on the book. Angel was directed by Philip Rose and choreographed by Robert Tucker. The production featured costumes by Pearl Somner, lighting design by John Gleason and scenery by Ming Cho Lee.

For her performance, Frances Sternhagen received a 1978 Tony Award nomination for Best Actress in a Musical. Additionally, Joel Higgins was nominated for a 1978 Drama Desk Award for Outstanding Featured Actor in a Musical.
 
The musical was savaged by the critics, and closed on May 13 after only five performances.

Songs
Angel is set in Altamount, North Carolina in the fall of 1916. In Act One, the scene is the Dixieland Boarding House. In Act Two, Scene One is set in Gant's marble yard and shop; and Scenes Two and Three are set again in the Dixieland Boarding House.

Act One
"Angel Theme" – Orchestra
"All the Comforts of Home" – Boarders
"Like the Eagles Fly" – Ben Gant
"Make a Little Sunshine" – Eliza Gant, Eugene Gant, Ben Gant
"Fingers and Toes" – W.O. Gant, Tim Laughran, Reed McKinney, Joe Tarkington
"Fatty" – Ben Gant
"Astoria Gloria" – Fatty Pert and Boarders
"Railbird" – Eugene Gant
"If I Ever Loved Him" – Laura James
"A Dime Ain't Worth a Nickel" – Ben Gant, Fatty Pert
"I Got a Dream to Sleep On" – Eugene Gant
"Drifting" – Eliza Gant

Act Two
"I Can't Believe It's You" – W.O. Gant, Madam Victoria
"Feelin' Loved" – Eugene Gant, Laura James
"A Medley" – Ben, Fatty, Eliza, Laura
"Tomorrow I'm Gonna Be Old" – W.O. Gant
"Feelin' Loved (Reprise)" – Eugene and Laura
"How Do You Say Goodbye" – Laura
"Gant's Waltz" – W.O. Gant and Eliza Gant
"Like the Eagles Fly (Reprise)" – Eugene Gant

Original Broadway cast
Donna Davis – Helen Gant 	
Joel Higgins – Ben Gant
Patti Allison – Mrs. Fatty Pert
Grace Carney – Mrs. Snowden
Don Scardino – Eugene Gant 	
Frances Sternhagen – Eliza Gant 	
Elek Hartman -	Will Pentland 	
Rebecca Seay -	Florry Mangle 	
Justine Johnston – Mrs. Clatt
Gene Masoner -	Jake Clatt  	
Billy Beckham – Mr. Farrell
Jayne Barnett – Miss Brown
Leslie Ann Ray – Laura James 	
Fred Gwynne – W. O. Gant 	
Daniel Keyes – Dr. Maguire 	
Rex David Hays – Joe Tarkington 	
Carl Nicholas – Reed McKinney
Norman Stotz – Tim Laughran
Patricia Englund – Madame Victoria

Critical response
Reviewing for The New York Times, Richard Eder wrote:
"Angel...is a damp and oppressive amalgam of bathos. It has lyrics of the consistency of cornbread soaked in milk, a whole collection of indifferent performances and a score of sufficient banality to furnish a number or two for the piped music on airplanes waiting to take off."
"The performances have no shine to them; at best they are losing battles."
"Mr. Geld's score is so thin and trite as to make us notice Don Walker's orchestration. Its vulgarity is unfailing."
"It is putting things too strongly to call "Angel" a disaster. It is a desert."

References
Botto, Louis. Playbill: At This Theatre (Applause Books, 2002)
"Angel Turns Wolfe Into Music; Looking Homeward", The New York Times, May 11, 1978.

External links
 
Angel at Floormic.com

1978 musicals
Broadway musicals
Fiction set in 1916
Musicals based on novels
Musicals based on plays
Plays set in North Carolina
Plays set in the 1910s